Bučje, Croatia  may refer to:

 Bučje, Pleternica
 Bučje, Pakrac